The Filmfare Awards are annual awards that honour artistic and technical excellence in the Hindi-language film industry of India. The Filmfare ceremony is one of the most famous film events in India. The awards were first introduced by the Filmfare magazine of The Times Group in 1954, the same year as the National Film Awards. They were initially referred to as the "Clare Awards" or "The Clares" after Clare Mendonca, the editor of The Times of India.

A dual voting system was developed in 1956. Under this system, in contrast to the National Film Awards, which are decided by a panel appointed by the Indian Government, the Filmfare Awards are voted on by both the public and a committee of experts. The ceremony has been sponsored by various private organisations in the past as well as in present provisions. During several years in the 1990s, a live ceremony was broadcast to television audiences but was later discontinued due to unknown reasons.

Since 2001, a recorded and edited version of the awards ceremony was televised on SET a week or two after the ceremony has been held. Since 2018, the ceremony has been televised on Colors. The 65th Filmfare Awards event was held on the 16th of February 2020 at Sarusajai Stadium, Guwahati.
Until the mid-1990s, Filmfare Awards were the preeminent and most-recognised awards in Bollywood until several other awards sprouted up in Mumbai. This has resulted in poor viewership since the 2000s.

In addition to the flagship event, Filmfare also has variants for other Indian film industries, such as Filmfare Awards South for South Indian cinema, Filmfare Marathi Awards for Marathi cinema, and Filmfare Awards East for eastern Indian cinema.

History

The Introduction 

The Filmfare awards were first introduced in 1954. The Clares was the original name of the award ceremony, named after The Times of India critic Clare Mendonca. Readers of Filmfare were polled to decide the winners, and over 20,000 readers spread throughout India participated in the polls; trophies were given to winners of the popular vote. In the first awards function, held on 21 March 1954 at the Metro Theatre of Mumbai, only five awards were presented: Best Film, Best Director, Best Actor, Best Actress, and Best Music Director. 

Do Bigha Zameen was the first movie to win the award for Best Film. The first winners for the other four categories were: Bimal Roy for his direction of Do Bigha Zameen, Dilip Kumar for his performance in Daag, Meena Kumari for her performance in Baiju Bawra, and Naushad Ali for his music in Baiju Bawra. The Filmfare Awards also introduced the Short Film Category in 2017, with Vidya Balan and Gauri Shinde on the jury. The People's Choice Award for Best Short Film was presented to Khamakha. Short films like Chutney, Matitali Kusti and Taandav won awards as well.

Hollywood star Gregory Peck was invited to be the guest of honour at the first ever awards on 21 March 1954 at the Metro theatre, Mumbai but could not make it to the function since his flight from Colombo got delayed. However, Peck did attend the banquet that followed the award night at Wellington Club (Gymkhana), Mumbai.

Postponement in 1986 and 1987 
The winners for the year 1985 were announced in 1986 and the event was scheduled to be held at the Brabourne Stadium in December 1986. Unfortunately, the Bombay Film Industry as it was known then, went on strike in 1986 because of its many contentious issues with the Government of Maharashtra. As a result, the ceremony was pushed to the next year. The winners of 1985 were awarded on 28 January 1987. For security reasons, the Filmfare was not awarded for 1986 and 1987.

The Red Carpet 
The Red Carpet is a segment that takes place before the beginning of the actual ceremony. This is when actors, actresses, producers, directors, singers, composers, and others that have contributed to Indian cinema are introduced. Hosts question the celebrities about upcoming performances and who they think deserves to take the Black Lady home.

In 2013 
The 2013 Filmfare awards took place in Mumbai at the Yash Raj Studios in Andheri. A special press conference was held just for its announcement and this took place at the Suburban hotel in Mumbai as well. The theme that year was a hundred years in the future. The reason for the theme to be held that year was because it was meant to be continuous from the previous year's theme, where the fraternity celebrated the completion of a hundred years in Indian cinema at the box office.

Filmfare Statuette 
The statuette, depicting a woman whose arms are upraised in a dance number with her fingers touching, is commonly referred to as "The Black Lady" (or "The Lady in Black"). Originally designed by N.G. Pansare under the supervision of Times of India'''s art director Walter Langhammer, it is generally made of bronze, its height is 46.5 cm and it weighs around 5 kg. To celebrate the 25th year of the awards, the statues were made in silver and to celebrate the 50th year the statues were made in gold. The Filmfare trophy is manufactured by The Award Gallery since 2000. Until 2012, there had only been a few changes made to the trophy. But more recently, as of 2013, a huge change has been made to give the trophy a 3-D look. There were two reasons given for this change. First of all, the organisers believe that it was necessary to match the many advances in technology in today's world, which will advance a lot more in the coming years as well. This was also an attempt to match the theme of the 2013 set of awards at Filmfare in Mumbai: a hundred years leap into the future.

 Popular awards 
Current awards
 Best Film: since 1954
 Best Director: since 1954
 Best Actor: since 1954
 Best Actress: since 1954
 Best Supporting Actor: since 1955
 Best Supporting Actress: since 1955
 Best Male Debut: since 1989
 Best Female Debut: since 1989
 Best Debut Director: since 2010
 Best Music Director: since 1954
 Best Lyricist: since 1959
 Best Male Playback Singer: since 1959
 Best Female Playback Singer: since 1959

Discontinued awards
 Best Performance in a Comic Role (1967–2007)
Best Performance in a Negative Role (1992–2007)

 Critics' awards 
Current critics’ awards
 Best Film (Critics): since 1971
 Best Actor (Critics): since 1998
 Best Actress (Critics): since 1998

Discontinued critics’ awards
 Best Documentary (1967–1997)
 Filmfare Critics Award for Best Performance (1991–1997)

 Technical awards 
 Best Story: since 1955
 Best Screenplay: since 1969
 Best Dialogue: since 1959
 Best Action: since 1993
 Best Art Direction: since 1956
 Best Background Score: since 1998
 Best Cinematography: since 1954
 Best Editing: since 1956
 Best Choreography: since 1989
 Best Sound Design: since 1955
 Best Special Effects: since 2007
 Best Costume Design: since 1995

 Special awards 
Current special awards
 Lifetime Achievement: since 1991
 RD Burman Award for New Music Talent: since 1995
 Special Performance Award: since 1972

Discontinued special awards
 Best Scene of the Year (1998–2012)
 Power Award (2003–2007)

 Short film awards 
 People's choice award for Best Short Film
 Best Short Film in Fiction
 Best Short Film in Non-Fiction
 Best Actor Male Short Film
 Best Actor Female Short Film
 OTT awards 

In 2020, Filmfare started Filmfare OTT Awards'' for the best in web series.
 Best Series
 Best Director (Series) 
 Best Series (Critics)
 Best Director (Critics)
 Best Actor in a Drama Series (Male)
 Best Actor in a Drama Series (Female)
 Best Actor in a Drama Series (Critics) 
 Best Actress in a Drama Series (Critics) 
 Best Actor in a Comedy Series (Male)
 Best Actor in a Comedy Series (Female)
 Best Actor in a Comedy Series (Critics) 
 Best Actress in a Comedy Series (Critics)
 Best Actor in A Supporting Role in a Drama Series (Male)
 Best Actor in A Supporting Role in a Drama Series (Female)
 Best Actor in A Supporting Role in a Comedy Series (Male)
 Best Actor in A Supporting Role in a Comedy Series (Female)
 Best Comedy (Series/Specials)
 Best Film (Web Original)
 Best Actor in a Web Original Film (Male)
 Best Actor in a Web Original Film (Female)
 Best Actor in a Supporting Role in a Web Original Film (Male)
 Best Actor in a Supporting Role in a Web Original Film (Female)
 Best Original Story (Series)
 Best Screenplay (Series)
 Best Dialogue
 Best Cinematography (Series)
 Best Production Design (Series)
 Best Editing (Series)
 Best Costume Design (Series)
 Best Background Music (Series)
 Best Original Soundtrack (Series)

See also
 Bollywood
 Cinema of India
 List of Filmfare Award records
 Filmfare
 Filmfare Short Film Awards
Filmfare OTT Awards

References

External links

 Filmfare Awards
List of Filmfare Award Winners and Nominations, 1953–2005

 
Indian film awards
Bollywood film awards
Events of The Times Group
Film industry in Mumbai
 01
Awards established in 1954
1954 establishments in Bombay State